Affonso Schmidt  (29 June 1890 – 3 April 1964) was a journalist, short story writer, novelist, and playwright.

Biography
Affonso Schmidt was born on Sunday, 29 June 1890, in Cubatão.  In the city of Sao Paulo, he founded the newspapers, A Plebe and A Lanterna, along with legendary figures of the  anarchist movement: Edgard Leuenroth and Oreste Ristori.

In the city of Rio de Janeiro, founded the newspaper A Voz do Povo, which, in time, became the press organ of the workers of the country.

Writer extensively throughout his life, was the author of a vast literary and poetic work gathered in more than forty books and is also a pioneer of science fiction in Brazil.  He died on Friday, 3 April 1964, in São Paulo, aged 73, around three days after the 1964 Brazilian coup d'état.

Selected works

Poetry
 Lírios Roxos (1907)
 Miniaturas
 Janelas Abertas (1911)
 Mocidade  (1921)
 Garoa (1932)
 Lusitania
 Poesias (1934)
 Poesia (1945)

Novels
 Brutalidade
 Os impunes
 O dragão e as virgens (fantasia)
 Pirapora
 As levianas
 Passarinho verde
 Ao relento (fantasia)
 Kellani
 A revolução brasileira (crônicas)
 A nova conflagração
 O evangelho dos livros
 Os negros
 Carne para canhão
 Curiango
 A sombra de Júlio Frank (romance)
 Colônia Cecília (romance)
 O Retrato de Valentina (1947) (romance)
 A Marcha (romance)
 O Menino Felipe (romance)
 O Tesouro de Cananeia (contos)
 A Vida de Paulo Eiró (crônicas)
 São Paulo de meus Amores (crônicas)
 Zanzalá (1938) (novela)
 A Primeira Viagem (autobiografia)

References

External links
  Afonso Schmidt's biography

1890 births
1964 deaths
Brazilian writers
Brazilian people of German descent
People from Cubatão

Brazilian anarchists